Ulrike Frank (born 1 February 1969) is a German actress known for her portrayal of Katrin Flemming on the daily drama Gute Zeiten, schlechte Zeiten.

Career

Mallorca
In late 1998, ProSieben planned on launching its first soap opera. Grundy Ufa took an original idea which saw the series set on the Spanish island Majorca. The show Mallorca – Suche nach dem Paradies premiered in April 1999 with Ulrike Frank being an original cast member. Frank became more important to the show when it was revealed that she portrayed the first transsexual character in a German soap opera. Julia Breuer, Frank's character, choose Majorca to start over and create a life for her as a woman. However her secret was eventually discovered by Felipe who would eventually romance Julia after overcoming some obstacles. After almost one year on the year, Mallorca was canceled due to high production costs and ratings that rose too slowly for the network.

Gute Zeiten, schlechte Zeiten
In 2000, Frank was approached by RTL for the role of Tina Zimmermann in their new primetime soap opera Großstadtträume. The new format was a spin-off from Gute Zeiten, schlechte Zeiten and the role of Tina was an original cast member of the show, previously played by Sandra Keller. After negotiations with Keller for a return in the role fell through, the network decided to recast. Ulrike Frank first appeared in the role of Tina in Gute Zeiten, schlechte Zeiten on 27 April 2000. Her six-episode stint ended on 8 May 2000. Directly after her last appearance, Großstadtträume premiered. However ratings for the spin-off were extremely low and the network canceled the format after seven from 26 ordered episodes.

Two and half years later, Frank reappeared on Gute Zeiten, schlechte Zeiten. This time originating the role of architect and businesswoman Katrin Flemming. The role was on a recurring basis and after appearing on 30 December 2002, Frank left the programme once again on 11 April 2003; finishing filming in late February. However, the role was well received by viewers and after the show had to fill the void of a female antagonist, Frank was brought back the following year with reappearing on-screen on 5 April 2004. Frank has since become an important part of the series. Katrin's image from a cold businesswoman changed over the years with the character becoming a mother and discovering that nanny Jasmin Nowak is the daughter she gave up for adoption almost twenty years ago.

Filmography

 2008: Im Namen des Gesetzes – Tödlicher Einbruch
 2009: SOKO Leipzig – Ein neues Leben
 2010: Alles was zählt
 2020: SOKO München: Nackte Wahrheit

References

External links 
 
 charade-agentur.com

1969 births
Living people
German soap opera actresses
Actresses from Stuttgart
German television actresses